This is a list of people who have served as Lord Lieutenant of Surrey. Since 1737, all Lords Lieutenant have also been Custos Rotulorum of Surrey.

Lord Lieutenants of Surrey

William Parr, 1st Marquess of Northampton 1551–1553?
William Howard, 1st Baron Howard of Effingham 1559–1573
Charles Howard, 1st Earl of Nottingham 3 July 1585 – 14 December 1624 jointly with
Charles Howard, 2nd Earl of Nottingham 27 July 1621 – 1642 jointly with
John Ramsay, 1st Earl of Holderness 5 June 1624 – February 1626 and
Edward Cecil, 1st Viscount Wimbledon 5 January 1627 – 16 November 1638 and
Thomas Howard, 21st Earl of Arundel 23 July 1635 – 1642 and
Henry Howard, Lord Maltravers 2 June 1636 – 1642
Interregnum
John Mordaunt, 1st Viscount Mordaunt 16 July 1660 – 5 June 1675
Prince Rupert of the Rhine 24 June 1675 – 29 November 1682
Henry Howard, 7th Duke of Norfolk 16 December 1682 – 2 April 1701
Charles Berkeley, 2nd Earl of Berkeley 7 June 1702 – 24 September 1710
George FitzRoy, 1st Duke of Northumberland 9 October 1710 – 24 December 1714
Charles Montagu, 1st Earl of Halifax 24 December 1714 – 19 May 1715
John Campbell, 2nd Duke of Argyll 16 July 1715 – 6 July 1716
Richard Onslow, 1st Baron Onslow 6 July 1716 – 5 December 1717
Thomas Onslow, 2nd Baron Onslow 9 December 1717 – 5 June 1740
Richard Onslow, 3rd Baron Onslow 13 November 1740 – 8 October 1776
George Onslow, 1st Earl of Onslow 20 November 1776 – 17 May 1814
George Brodrick, 4th Viscount Midleton 15 June 1814 – 27 September 1830
Charles George Perceval, 2nd Baron Arden 27 September 1830 – 5 July 1840
William King-Noel, 1st Earl of Lovelace 17 July 1840 – 29 December 1893
Adm. Hon. Francis Egerton 25 September 1893 – 15 December 1895
William Brodrick, 8th Viscount Midleton 29 January 1896 – 19 December 1905
Henry Cubitt, 2nd Baron Ashcombe 19 December 1905 – 6 June 1939
Sir John Malcolm Fraser, 1st Baronet 6 June 1939 – 4 May 1949
Gen. Sir Robert Haining 2 August 1949 – 6 August 1957
Geoffrey FitzClarence, 5th Earl of Munster 6 August 1957 – 12 March 1973
John Hamilton, 3rd Baron Hamilton of Dalzell 12 March 1973 – 2 May 1986
Sir Richard Thornton 2 May 1986 – 29 October 1997
Dame Sarah Jane Frances Goad, DCVO, JP 29 October 1997 – 23 August 2015
Michael More-Molyneux DL 24 August 2015 – Present

Deputy lieutenants
A deputy lieutenant of Surrey is commissioned by the Lord Lieutenant of Surrey. Deputy lieutenants support the work of the lord-lieutenant. There can be several deputy lieutenants at any time, depending on the population of the county. Their appointment does not terminate with the changing of the lord-lieutenant, but they usually retire at age 75.

19th Century
18 July 1848: James William Freshfield, Esq.
August 1852: Henry Gosse, Esq.

References

External links
Lord Lieutenant of Surrey

Surrey
Lord-Lieutenants of Surrey
Surrey-related lists